Nicholas Reese Art (born January 13, 1999) is an American former child actor. He is best known for his roles in the films Syriana (2005) and The Nanny Diaries (2007).

Life and career
Art was born in Milford, Connecticut on January 13, 1999, the son of Sharon and Richard Art.

He began his career at the age of three, playing Zach Spaulding on the soap opera Guiding Light (2002–2008). He then appeared in the feature films Syriana (2005) and The Nanny Diaries (2007), the television series Cashmere Mafia (2008) and the television film Taking Chance (2009). His last film job was an uncredited role in Knight and Day (2010).

Awards and nominations

References

External links
 

1999 births
Living people
American male child actors
American male film actors
American male soap opera actors
American male television actors
21st-century American male actors
Male actors from Connecticut
People from Milford, Connecticut